"Let's Hurt Tonight" is a song by American pop rock band OneRepublic. It was released as the third single from their fourth studio album, Oh My My on December 6, 2016, along with its music video. The song was included in the 2016 film Collateral Beauty. It has since reached the top 100 in Austria and Germany, and the top 50 in Switzerland.

Track listing

Music video
As of June 2018, there are two music videos for the song. One music video, released on December 6, 2016, featuring scenes from Collateral Beauty, has over 113 million views, while another version, released on February 16, 2017, without scenes from the movie, has over 5 million views.

Charts

Weekly charts

Year-end charts

Certifications

References

2016 singles
2016 songs
OneRepublic songs
Songs written by Ryan Tedder
Songs written by Brent Kutzle
Mosley Music Group singles